James Ferguson Munro (25 March 1926 – 22 June 1997), was a Scottish footballer. who played as a right winger in the English Football League.

References

External links

1926 births
1997 deaths
Scottish footballers
Association football wingers
Aberdeen F.C. players
Dunfermline Athletic F.C. players
Waterford F.C. players
Manchester City F.C. players
Oldham Athletic A.F.C. players
Lincoln City F.C. players
Bury F.C. players
Weymouth F.C. players
Poole Town F.C. players
English Football League players
Scottish Football League players